Suruchi Adarkar is an Indian Marathi actress who has featured in Marathi television serials. She started her career with an ad play Avagha Rang Ekachi Zhala. She known for her portrayal in Zee Marathi's Ka Re Durava as Aditi Khanolkar.

Life and career

Adarkar appeared as Aditi in Ka Re Durava. She also acted a small role in the Hindi film Tathastu, wherein Sanjay Dutt was the hero. Apart from this, she supports women empowerment, an initiative by Zee Marathi Jagruti.

Filmography

Television

Films 
 Tathastu (Hindi)
 Maat (2013)
 Narbachi Wadi
 Ata Batli Futli
 Ghaath (2023)

Play 
 Avagha Rang Ekchi Zhala

References

External links
 Suruchi Adarkar at IMDb

Marathi actors
Living people
Indian film actresses
Indian television actresses
Actresses from Pune
21st-century Indian actresses
Actresses in Marathi cinema
Actresses in Hindi cinema
Year of birth missing (living people)